The 2009 European Parliament election for the election of the delegation from the Netherlands was held on 4 June 2009.
This is the 7th time the elections have been held for the European elections in the Netherlands.

Sources for everything below:

Numbering of the candidates list 

The official order and names of candidate lists:

| colspan="6" | 
|-
! style="background-color:#E9E9E9;text-align:center;vertical-align:top;" colspan=5 | Lists
|-
!style="background-color:#E9E9E9;text-align:center;" colspan="3"|List
!style="background-color:#E9E9E9;| English translation
!style="background-color:#E9E9E9;| List name (Dutch)
|-
| 1
| 
| style="text-align:left;" | list
| style="text-align:left;" | CDA - European People's Party
| style="text-align:left;" | CDA – Europese Volkspartij

|-
| 2
| 
| style="text-align:left;" | list
| style="text-align:left;" | P.v.d.A./European Social Democrats
| style="text-align:left;" | P.v.d.A./Europese Sociaaldemocraten

|-
| 3
| 
| style="text-align:left;" | list
| style="text-align:left;" | VVD - European Liberal-Democrats
| style="text-align:left;" | VVD – Europese Liberaal-Democraten

|-
| 4
| 
| style="text-align:left;" | list
| style="text-align:left;" | GreenLeft
| style="text-align:left;" | Groenlinks

|-
| 5
| 
| style="text-align:left;" | list
| style="text-align:left;" | SP (Socialist Party)
| style="text-align:left;" | SP (Socialistische Partij)

|-
| 6
| 
| style="text-align:left;" | list
| style="text-align:left;" | Christian Union-SGP
| style="text-align:left;" | ChristenUnie–SGP
|-

| 7
| 
| style="text-align:left;" | list
| style="text-align:left;" | Democrats 66 (D66)
| style="text-align:left;" | Democraten 66 (D66)

|-
| 8
| 
| style="text-align:left;" | list
| style="text-align:left;" colspan="2" | Newropeans

|-
| 9
| 
| style="text-align:left;" | list
| style="text-align:left;" | Europe Cheap! & Sustainable
| style="text-align:left;" | Europa Voordelig! & Duurzaam

|-
| 10
| 
| style="text-align:left;" | list
| style="text-align:left;" colspan="2" | Solidara

|-
| 11
| 
| style="text-align:left;" | list
| style="text-align:left;" | Party for the Animals
| style="text-align:left;" | Partij voor de Dieren

|-
| 12
| 
| style="text-align:left;" | list
| style="text-align:left;" | European Whistleblower Party (EKP)
| style="text-align:left;" | Europese Klokkenluiders Partij (EKP)

|-
| 13
| 
| style="text-align:left;" | list
| style="text-align:left;" | The Greens
| style="text-align:left;" | De Groenen

|-
| 14
| 
| style="text-align:left;" | list
| style="text-align:left;" |  PVV (Party for Freedom)
| style="text-align:left;" | PVV (Partij voor de Vrijheid)

|-
| 15
| 
| style="text-align:left;" | list
| style="text-align:left;" | Liberal Democratic Party
| style="text-align:left;" | Liberaal Democratische Partij

|-
| 16
| 
| style="text-align:left;" | list
| style="text-align:left;" | Party for European politics (PEP)
| style="text-align:left;" | Partij voor Europese Politiek (PEP)

|-
| 17
| 
| style="text-align:left;" | list
| style="text-align:left;" colspan="2" | Libertas

|-
|}

Candidate lists

CDA - European People's Party 

Below is the candidate list for the Christian Democratic Appeal for the 2009 European Parliament election

Elected members are in bold

P.v.d.A./European Social Democrats 

Below is the candidate list for the Labour Party for the 2009 European Parliament election

Elected members are in bold

VVD - European Liberal-Democrats 

Below is the candidate list for the People's Party for Freedom and Democracy for the 2009 European Parliament election

Elected members are in bold

GreenLeft 

Below is the candidate list for GreenLeft for the 2009 European Parliament election

Elected members are in bold

SP (Socialist Party) 

Below is the candidate list for Socialist Party for the 2009 European Parliament election

Elected members are in bold

Christian Union-SGP 

Below is the candidate list for Christian Union-SGP for the 2009 European Parliament election

Elected members are in bold

Democrats 66 (D66) 

Below is the candidate list for the Democrats 66 for the 2009 European Parliament election

Elected members are in bold

Newropeans 
Below is the candidate list for Newropeans for the 2009 European Parliament election

Europe Cheap! & Sustainable 
Below is the candidate list for Europe Cheap! & Sustainable for the 2009 European Parliament election

Solidara 
Below is the candidate list for Solidara for the 2009 European Parliament election

Party for the Animals 

Below is the candidate list for Party for the Animals for the 2009 European Parliament election

European Whistleblower Party (EKP) 
Below is the candidate list for European Whistleblower Party (EKP) for the 2009 European Parliament election

The Greens 

Below is the candidate list for The Greens for the 2009 European Parliament election

PVV (Party for Freedom) 

Below is the candidate list for Party for Freedom for the 2009 European Parliament election

Elected members are in bold

Liberal Democratic Party 

Below is the candidate list for Liberal Democratic Party for the 2009 European Parliament election

Party for European politics (PEP) 
Below is the candidate list for Party for European politics (PEP) for the 2009 European Parliament election

Libertas 
Below is the candidate list for Libertas for the 2009 European Parliament election

References

2009
Netherlands